Anzar (also Romanized as Anz̄ar and Anzer) is a village in Chavarzaq Rural District, Chavarzaq District, Tarom County, Zanjan Province, Iran. At the 2006 census, its population was 785, in 199 families.

Anzar is baby boy name mainly popular in Muslim religion and its main origin is Arabic. Anzar name meanings is Angel of paradise Popular people with Anzar name is Anzar Aslam Shah of SJBIT.

References 

Populated places in Tarom County